William Thomas Wainwight (28 October 1917 – 1976) was an English professional footballer who played in the Football League for Aldershot and Mansfield Town.

References

1917 births
1976 deaths
English footballers
Association football wing halves
English Football League players
Worksop Town F.C. players
Aldershot F.C. players
Mansfield Town F.C. players